Flight 277 may refer to:

Iran Air Flight 277, crashed on January 9, 2011
Prinair Flight 277, crashed on March 5, 1969
Linjeflyg Flight 277, crashed on November 20, 1964
TWA Flight 277, crashed on June 20, 1944

0277